Filkins and Broughton Poggs is a civil parish in West Oxfordshire, on the Oxfordshire county boundary with Gloucestershire. The parish includes the villages of Filkins and Broughton Poggs, which were separate civil parishes until they were merged in 1954. The population in the 2011 Census was 434.

References

External links
Filkins and Broughton Poggs: A Cotswold Village

Civil parishes in Oxfordshire
West Oxfordshire District